Swedish Holocaust Museum is a historical museum located in Stockholm, Sweden. The museum is currently being headed by Katherine Hauptman.

History
The idea of museum was proposed in 2018 by Polish-born Holocaust survivor, Max Safir.

In 2020, the government of Sweden announced that they will establish a museum in the memory of the Holocaust and allocated $1.1 million for the project.

In June 2022, the museum was inaugurated by the Swedish Minister of Culture, Jeanette Gustafsdotter.

References

Museums in Stockholm
2022 establishments in Sweden